Pristiterebra tuberculosa, common name : the tuberculate auger, is a species of sea snail, a marine gastropod mollusk in the family Terebridae, the auger snails.

Description
The size of an adult shell varies between 30 mm and 73 mm.

Distribution
This species is distributed in the Pacific Ocean from Mexico to Ecuador.

References

 Bratcher T. & Cernohorsky W.O. (1987). Living terebras of the world. A monograph of the recent Terebridae of the world. American Malacologists, Melbourne, Florida & Burlington, Massachusetts. 240pp.
 Terryn Y. (2007). Terebridae: A Collectors Guide. Conchbooks & NaturalArt. 59pp + plates

External links
 

Terebridae
Gastropods described in 1844